The trifluorooxonium cation is a hypothetical positively charged polyatomic ion with chemical formula . It is structurally equivalent to the hydronium ion where the hydrogen atoms surrounding the central oxygen atom have been replaced by fluorine, and is isoelectronic with nitrogen trifluoride. This cation would be an example of oxygen in the unprecedented +4 oxidation state.

The  cation was shown to be vibrationally stable at all levels of theory applied (HF, MP2, CCSD(T)).  was proposed to possess a pyramidal structure with an O–F bond length of 1.395 Å and F–O–F bond angles of 104.2° (CCSD(T) level of theory). The  detachment energy of the  cation was calculated to be +110.1 kcal mol−1.

The formation of the hypothetical salt  was calculated to be about thermoneutral, but slightly unfavorable with  = +10.5 kcal mol−1.

See also
Tetrafluoroammonium

References

Oxonium compounds
Hypothetical chemical compounds